Allein ("alone") is the fifth studio album by German rapper Capital Bra, released on 2 November 2018, through EGJ and distributed by Sony Music, digitally. Upon its release, the album debuted within the top five in German-speaking Europe. Four tracks of the album were released as singles, with "Roli Glitzer Glitzer" reaching No. 1 in Germany. The single "Fightclub"—a collaboration with AK Ausserkontrolle and Samra—reached No. 3 in Germany, making it Capital Bra's first single in six months to not debut atop the German single charts.

Background
Capital Bra released his fourth studio album Berlin lebt in June 2018, to great commercial success. The album debuted at the pole positions in German-speaking Europe and all singles of the album reached the top of the German single chart. A week prior to the release of Berlin lebt, he left his label Team Kuku, because of differences in interests. The album was announced on 20 August 2018 by Capital Bra through Instagram. The album's release date was announced on 30 October 2018, as the last release through Team Kuku.

Track list
Credits adapted from Apple Music and GEMA.

Charts

References

Capital Bra albums
2018 albums